In optical storage, constant angular velocity (CAV) is a qualifier for the rated speed of any disc containing information, and may also be applied to the writing speed of recordable discs. A drive or disc operating in CAV mode maintains a constant angular velocity, contrasted with a constant linear velocity (CLV).

A typical CD-ROM drive operates in CLV mode, in contrast to a floppy or hard disk drive, or gramophone, which operates in CAV mode.  In CAV mode, the spindle motor turns at a constant speed, which makes the medium pass by the read/write head faster when the head is positioned at the outside of the disk.  In contrast, in CLV mode, the spindle motor speed varies so that the medium passes by the head at the same speed regardless of where on the disk the head is positioned.  

If the disk is recorded at the same areal density throughout, then when read or written in CAV mode, the data rate is higher for the outer tracks than for the inner tracks, whereas in CLV mode, the data rate is the same everywhere.

An advantage of CAV mode over CLV is that the drive mechanism is easier to engineer (less expensive to build).  Another advantage is that a device can switch from reading one part of a disk to reading another part more quickly, because in CLV mode, when the device moves the head in or out, it must change the speed of the disc.

Dimensions 

In case of a 12 cm standard diameter disc, data at the outermost edge (6 cm from center) is accessed at 2.4 times the speed of data at the inner edge of the data-containing program area (2.5 cm from center).

For a miniature disc with a diameter of 8 cm (radius of 4 cm), the speed ratio of outer to inner data edge is 1.6.

This means that, for example, if a disc is accessed at a constant angular velocity of ×24, the equivalent linear velocity is ×24 while accessed at the outermost edge of the data area while being ×10 at the innermost data area.

Uses

Gramophone records have always used CAV, including CEDs which provide video signals.

Some high speed CD and DVD drives use CAV. It allows for shorter access times because the rotation speed (angular velocity) does not need to be changed when the laser seeks across the disc, similarly to the magnetic head of a hard disk drive. It also allows for the fastest writing speeds on recordable media (e.g. CD-R, DVD±R, BD-R) because the disc can spin at the highest physically possible angular speed throughout the entire writing process. A linear (data reading and writing) speeds of 2.4 times higher can be reached at the outer disc edge with the same angular (rotation) speed.

CAV was used in the LaserDisc format for interactive titles; it was also used with special editions of certain films. CAV allowed for perfect still frames, as well as random access to any given frame on a disc. Playing time, however, was 30 minutes on each side (these discs are also known as "standard play"), as opposed to 60 minutes on each side for CLV-based discs ("extended play").

CAV is used with the Nintendo GameCube Game disc and Wii Optical disc, the original Xbox discs, and Sega's GD-ROM.

Partial constant angular velocity (P-CAV) 
If the used media (e.g. DVD-RAM variants) has a linear (writing) speed limitation that can not be attained with physically supported angular (rotation) speeds at the inner edge of the recordable area, the disc writing can start off with a constant angular velocity, until the increasing linear velocity has reached the writing speed limitation of the disc.

At that point, the drive transitions into writing with a constant linear velocity.

See also
 Constant linear velocity (CLV)
 Zone bit recording (ZCAV)

References

External links
 http://www.pcguide.com/ref/hdd/geom/tracksZBR-c.html
Rotating disc computer storage media
Audio storage
Video storage
Optical computer storage